Gérald Passedat (born 24 March 1960) is a French chef, owner of the restaurant Le Petit Nice in Marseille. He has three stars at the Guide Michelin since 2008.

Biography

Family 
The grandfather of Gérald Passedat, Germain, was born in 1871 in the Tarn-et-Garonne. After a training in baking and pastry in Paris, he created his company in Marseille. He bought and sold several companies and rebought in 1917 the Villa Corinthe, next to the sea near the Château d'If and the Frioul archipelago and next to the hill of Notre-Dame de la Garde to create the restaurant Le Petit Nice.

His father Jean-Paul was born in 1933. Like his mother, he became an opera singer but also got interested in cuisine. In the 1960s, he decided to become a full-time chef and hotel owner. He transformed with his wife Le Petit Nice in a luxury hotel, which gave him the opportunity to receive a first Michelin star in 1977 and a second one in 1981. Jean-Paul Passédat also received the title of Chevalier of the National Order of Merit in 1988.

Childhood and training course 
Gérald Passedat was born on 24 March 1960 in Marseille. As a young child, he spent his time in the kitchens observing the work of his father and the housemaids. He decided to become a chef as well and followed a rich eight-year training course.
École Hôtelière of Nice (like his father)
Le Coq Hardi in Bougival
Le Bristol in Paris
Le Crillon in Paris
Restaurant of the Frères Troisgros in Roanne
Les Prés d'Eugénie in Eugénie-les-Bains with Michel Guérard
In 1985, he joined the kitchens of his father's restaurant Le Petit Nice. He then became the chef in 1987 when his father became the manager of the hotel restaurant.

Cuisine 
As an enthusiast of underwater diving, the cuisine of Gérald Passedat is composed of a number of steps and is mostly made of fish. It is also influenced by the Provence and especially Marseille, for its different vegetables and herbs.

Forgotten fishes 
His cuisine is Mediterranean, where he finds with the help of fishermen from Marseille, fishes that are often forgotten like the tub gurnard, the wrasse or the comber. These fishes, fished all around Marseille, come from different areas deep underwater. In many of his dishes, the fish succeed to crustaceans and is conceived in a broth or a carcass emulsion, without adding fat.

Desserts 
His desserts are made to impress as much in the visual than in the taste. He and his pastry chef create desserts with chocolate, liquorice and all kinds of fruits.
Pink Pralines
Chocolate "Équateur" with raspberry vinegar

Signature dishes 
Sea anemones in iodized cream, foamy milk with caviar, watercress broth and shellfish
Bass Lucie Passedat
Lobster with clarified ginger and purple abyssal
Bouillabaisse

Honours of Le Petit Nice and the Passedat family 
1977: one Michelin star (Jean-Paul Passedat)
1981: two Michelin stars (Jean-Paul Passedat)
1991: Jean-Paul Passedat is received at the Académie Nationale de Cuisine
2008: three Michelin stars
2010: Gérald Passedat is named Chevalier (Knight) of the Legion of Honour

See also 
List of Michelin 3-star restaurants

References

External links 
Official site of Gérald Passedat 

1960 births
French chefs
Head chefs of Michelin starred restaurants
Businesspeople from Marseille
Chevaliers of the Légion d'honneur
Living people